This is a list of episodes for the ABC television series Love, American Style. Most of the episodes consist of two or more unconnected segments.

Series overview

Episodes

Season 1 (1969–1970)

Season 2 (1970–1971)

Season 3 (1971–1972)

Season 4 (1972–1973)

Season 5 (1973–1974)

Home releases
At present, the following DVD sets have been released by Paramount Home Video.

References

External links
 

Love, American Style